The Ring of Fire: An Indonesian Odyssey is a series of five documentary films following the decade-long Wanderjahr of the filmmaker/sibling partnership Lorne and Lawrence Blair.

Background
With financing from investors including the BBC and Ringo Starr, the Blair Brothers arrived in Indonesia from England in 1972. Then the Indonesian archipelago offered isolation for neolithic cultures and their indigenous beliefs. The Blair Brothers spent over two decades documenting the relationships of island ecology and their peoples. One result of the Blair's work was a PBS-distributed multi-media package- an oversized picture book, alongside the Emmy-nominated BBC/PBS television series Ring of Fire. A book of the television series was published in 1988 and republished in 2010. A digitally remastered DVD was released in 2003. In 2021, in celebration of 50 years since filming began, Ring of Fire: An Indonesian Odyssey has been digitally remastered (both picture and sound) and is now available on iTunes (US, UK, AUS and CAN).

Production
Originally cut from 80 hours of 16mm film in co-production with WGBH-TV, Boston, Ring of Fire was produced, directed and photographed by Lorne Blair and co-produced and written by Lawrence Blair. Executive producer was Frontline'''s David Fanning. The films have since been shown in more than 60 countries. The 2021 digital remaster is produced and powered by SavEarth Media, an impact media company.

Films

 Reception 
In the Los Angeles Times'', Steve Weinstein called the series an "incomparable adventure teeming with thrills, chills, mystery and the bizarre".

References

External links
 Facebook page for the film series
 The home page for the re-issue of the DVD and a book
 
 
 
 

Films shot in Indonesia
Films scored by Mason Daring
1988 documentary films
1988 American television series debuts
1988 American television series endings
1980s American documentary television series
American documentary films